Girl's Day Everyday #3 (also stylized as Girl's Day Everyday III) is the fourth mini-album released by South Korean girl group, Girl's Day. It was released by Dream Tea Entertainment and distributed by Loen Entertainment on January 3, 2014. It consists of five songs, including the title track "Something", used to promote the EP on several South Korean music programs, including Music Bank and Inkigayo. A music video for the title track was also released on January 3.

The EP was a commercial success peaking at number 3 on the Gaon Album Chart. The EP has sold over 20,814 physical copies as of December 2014.

Background and release 
The EP was released on January 3, 2014, at midnight KST, through several music portals, including Melon, and iTunes for the global market.

Commercial performance 
Girl's Day Everyday #3 entered and peaked at number 3 on the Gaon Album Chart on the chart issue dated December 29, 2013 - January 4, 2014. In its second week, the EP fell to number 11 and in its third week to number 29. In its fourth week, the EP saw a rise to number 12 and again in its eighth week to number 11. The EP spent a total of thirteen consecutive weeks on the album chart.

The EP entered at number 12 on the Gaon Album Chart for the month of January 2014, with 9,593 physical copies sold. It also charted at number 24 for February, at number 66 for March and at number 70 for April, with a total of 17,585 copies sold. The EP also charted at number 77 on the Gaon Album Chart for the year-end of 2014, with 20,814 copies sold in that year.

Track listing 
Digital download

Charts

Weekly charts

Monthly charts

Year-end charts

Release history

References 

2014 EPs
Girl's Day albums